"The Arena" is a 2016 single released by violinist Lindsey Stirling.

Background
"The Arena" is the third track and first single from the album Brave Enough. The instrumental track was written by Stirling, Hanna and Bird and produced by RUMORS.   In the booklet released with Brave Enough, is a quote from Theodore Roosevelt said to have inspired the song:

"The Arena" features regularly on Stirling's live concert performances, from Brave Enough Tour through to her more recent Artemis Tour.

Music video
The music video for "The Arena" was released on June 28, 2016.  It features Stirling and professional dancer Derek Hough.  In a post-apocalyptic, Mad Max inspired environment, Stirling and Hough enter an arena surrounded by crowds and perform an elaborate dance. 

In an interview, Stirling said that the performance was said to be a display of how to combat criticism, especially our own. 

As of March 2022, the video has over 85 million views on YouTube.

References

2016 singles
2016 songs
Lindsey Stirling songs
Songs written by Lindsey Stirling
Songs written by Peter Hanna
Songs written by Taylor Bird (songwriter)